Methodist College Kuala Lumpur is a private college in Malaysia, established in 1983 by the Methodist Council of Education.

History 
The school is the successor of Methodist High School, set up as a school of second chance in 1969. The school took in many dropouts who lost their seats in government schools and equipped them for higher education and employment.

As the student population expanded, the school was  renamed  Methodist College Kuala Lumpur, under the direction of   1983 by principal Mrs F. R.  Bhupalan  beginning in 1983,   the focus  shifted  to pre-university courses.

It offered Secondary education (form 1 to form 5), form 6, and A-level. In 1994, students of the secondary education were relocated to a new campus in Sentul, currently known as the Wesley Methodist School, to accommodate the increasing number of students. In 1999, Methodist College Kuala Lumpur in Brickfields shifted its focus to A-level, followed by the introduction of AUSMAT, Diploma in Early Childhood Education, CAT and ACCA, and American Degree Transfer Program.

The college building was given a major renovation and expansion in year 2008 with the help from the Methodist Church who financed the launching fund. The college then raised the remaining renovation fund by itself and the new building was completed in year 2010.

The College 
The college now provides Cambridge A Level, Australian Matriculation (AUSMAT), Diploma in Early Childhood Education, Certified Accounting Technician (CAT), Diploma in Social Work, Diploma in English Literature, Association of Chartered Certified Accountants (ACCA),  and American Degree Transfer Program (ADTP).

MCKL also provides teachers' training through its Cambridge International Certificate & Diploma in Teaching and Learning programmes. 

Methodist College Kuala Lumpur (MCKL) has a total student population of 1600, with the biggest group of student pursuing the A Level program.

The current CEO for MCKL is Ms Angela Pok, who held the leadership responsibility with effect from 2 September 2019. Ms Angela is to replace Ms Moey Yoke Lai after her retirement on 31-July-2019, serving MCKL for the last 13 years. Ms Khor Keng Leik was appointed as the interim CEO for the month of August 2019.

Scholarships 
MCKL is well known for its generous scholarship schemes. It has Merit Scholarship granting scholarships ranging from 15% to 100% of the tuition fee. Scholarships are granted (subject to approval) based on academic results. For instance, achieving 3 A- in Sijil Pelajaran Malaysia (SPM) or IGCSE would be able to enjoy a 15% Merit Scholarship for the CAT programme. Other scholarships available include Special Scholarships (for Children of Methodist Church Pastors (100%), Children of Pastors from Other Churches (50%), Members of Methodist Churches in Malaysia (15%) High School Leavers from all Methodist Schools in Malaysia, Nobel International School, Sri Sempurna International School, SM Stella Maris, Vision School Tawau, all ICCE qualification, Sibling Scholarship (15%), Financial Aids and Alumni Scholarships. 

Alumni Scholarships are exclusive scholarships for MCKL students. Exclusive 100% scholarship for successful applicants into Heriot Watt University, University of Nottingham, INTI International University & Colleges, Help University and many more other scholarships.

University Partners 
Methodist College Kuala Lumpur has partnerships with the following Universities:

 Institute of Technology, Tralee
 University of Gloucestershire
 New Zealand Tertiary College

Affiliations 
Methodist College Kuala Lumpur has affiliation with the various institutions or bodies:

 Methodist Church in Malaysia
 Trinity Annual Conference
 Tamil Annual Conference 
 Methodist Council of Education Malaysia
 Malaysia Theological Seminary
 Wesley Methodist School Kuala Lumpur International
 Steadfast Association Kuala Lumpur
 Methodist Boys' School, Kuala Lumpur
 Sri Sempurna Internal School
 Wings Melaka
 Nobel International School
 Sekolah Menengah Stella Maris
 Sabah Anglican Academies
 Yayasan Kajian dan Pembanguanan Masyarakat
 Malaysia Association of Social Workers

References 

Colleges in Malaysia
Universities and colleges in Kuala Lumpur
Educational institutions established in 1983
1983 establishments in Malaysia
Cambridge schools in Malaysia